Anthony Aguirre is a theoretical cosmologist. Aguirre is a professor and holds the Faggin Presidential Chair for the Physics of Information at the University of California, Santa Cruz. He is the co-founder and associate scientific director of the Foundational Questions Institute and is also a co-founder of the Future of Life Institute. In 2015, he co-founded the aggregated prediction platform Metaculus with Greg Laughlin. In 2019, he published the pop science book Cosmological Koans.

Education 
Aguirre received a B.S. in Mathematics/Physics from Brown University in 1995, an M.S. in Astronomy from Harvard University in 1998 and a Ph.D. in Astronomy from Harvard University.

Career 
His research has focused on various topics in theoretical physics including early universe, inflation, the foundations of quantum mechanics, foundations of statistical mechanics, gravity physics, first stars, the intergalactic medium, galaxy formation and black holes.

Together with Max Tegmark he developed the cosmological interpretation of quantum mechanics.

In the media 
Aguirre appears in the How Vast is the Cosmos? part of the Closer to Truth PBS series.
Aguirre appears on the show Horizon, in the episode "How Big is the Universe?"
Aguirre also appears in the episode "Living in a Parallel Universe" of the Naked Science documentary series on the National Geographic Channel.
Aguirre was a guest on Sean Carroll’s Mindscape podcast, which was released on June 17, 2019 under the title of Cosmology, Zen, Entropy, and Information.
Through the Wormhole#Season 4

References 

Living people
American cosmologists
University of California, Santa Cruz faculty
Harvard Graduate School of Arts and Sciences alumni
Brown University alumni
Place of birth missing (living people)
1973 births